Drogen is a village and a former municipality in the district Altenburger Land, in Thuringia, Germany. Since 1 January 2019, it is part of the town Schmölln.

Geography

Neighboring municipalities
Municipalities near Drogen include Altkirchen, Dobitschen, Nöbdenitz, the city of Schmölln, and Wildenbörten.

Municipal organization
The municipality of Drogen consisted of two subdivisions: Drogen and Mohlis.

Trivia
Drogen has an unusual name (It means Drugs in German), which has resulted in its street sign being frequently stolen.

References

Altenburger Land
Duchy of Saxe-Altenburg
Former municipalities in Thuringia